Lil Pump is the debut studio album by American rapper Lil Pump. It was released on October 6, 2017, by Tha Lights Global and Warner Records. The album features guest appearances from frequent collaborator Smokepurpp, alongside Lil Yachty, Chief Keef, Gucci Mane, 2 Chainz and Rick Ross. It also features production from Bighead, Ronny J, Mr. 2-17 and CBMix, among others. It was supported by five singles – "Boss", "Flex Like Ouu", "D Rose", "Molly" and "Gucci Gang". A sequel was released 6 years later, on March 17th, 2023.

The album debuted at number three on the US Billboard 200 with first-week sales of 45,000 album-equivalent units. It was certified gold by the Recording Industry Association of America.

Background 
Lil Pump irst announceded the album on May 20, 2017 through Twitter. He first stated that the project was to be released in August of that year, however he never met this expected due date. While the fans waited for the project, he dropped “Gucci Gang” as the next single for the tape. A month later, Lil Pump announced that the album was finally completed along with the release date and cover art of his debut album days later.

Critical reception

XXL rated the album as 'L' and praised it as "a project that confirms its creator's arrival and his place as one of the leading men in the SoundCloud rap scene". It evaluated Lil Pump as a "capable, albeit repetitive rhymer that compensates for what he lacks in terms of depth, structure and variety with unbridled passion, catchy refrains and an ear for enticing production".

Evan Rytlewski of Pitchfork gave the album 6.9/10, writing that Lil Pump sounded "completely, endearingly stoked" all the way through the record and calling every track "loud, hyper, and catchy".

Commercial performance
The album debuted at number three on the US Billboard 200 with first-week sales of 45,000 album-equivalent units. On June 21, 2018, the album was certified Gold by the Recording Industry Association of America (RIAA) for combined sales album-equivalent units of over half a million units in the United States.

Track listing
Credits adapted from Tidal.

Notes
  signifies a co-producer
  signifies an additional producer
 "What U Sayin'" was originally titled What You Gotta Say

Personnel
Credits adapted from Tidal.

Performers
 Lil Pump – primary artist
 Smokepurpp – featured artist 
 Lil Yachty – featured artist 
 Gucci Mane – featured artist 
 Chief Keef – featured artist 
 2 Chainz – featured artist 
 Rick Ross – featured artist 

Technical
 Christopher Barnett – mix engineering 
 Josh Goldenberg – record engineering 

Production
 Fadedblackid – production 
 Trapphones – co-production 
 Bighead – production 
 Gnealz – production 
 Ronny J – production 
 Mr. 2-17 – production 
 Terrotuga – production 
 CBMix – production 
 TM88 – production 
 Captain Crunch – co-production 
 Diablo – production 
 Danny Wolf – production 
 Frank Dukes – co-production 
 Matthew Tavares – additional production 
 Chester Hansen – additional production 
 Illa Da Producer – production

Charts

Weekly charts

Year-end charts

Certifications

References

External links

2017 debut albums
Albums produced by Frank Dukes
Albums produced by Ronny J
Albums produced by TM88
Warner Records albums
Lil Pump albums
Trap music albums